Karl O'Dowda (born 8 May 1970) is a New Zealand former cricketer. He played first-class and List A matches for Central Districts and Otago between 1988 and 2001.

See also
 List of Otago representative cricketers

References

External links
 

1970 births
Living people
New Zealand cricketers
Central Districts cricketers
Otago cricketers
Cricketers from New Plymouth